Midwest is the third studio album by Norwegian jazz musician Mathias Eick. The album was released by the label ECM Records on 20 March 2015.

Composition
Midwest consists of eight new songs dealing with the concept of home. The album was inspired by his tour of the US and Canada. The music is a tribute to the way the people and music move around the world. During its creation, this album was focused on the Midwestern United States because in the past, many Norwegians left Europe to move to America and settled in the Midwest.

Reception
Thom Jurek in his review for AllMusic says that "The compositions are all lyrical, in typical Eick fashion, but with [Gjermund] Larsen they take on a rougher, more earthen quality." and that "it perfectly illustrates the thematic frame of the journey he set out to portray: that of the immigrant encountering the unknown and embracing it" In his review for The Guardian, Dave Gely gave this album four stars and says that "Eick has a beautiful tone and writes attractive themes, by turns haunting and energetic." and added that "The inclusion of folk violinist Gjermund Larsen in the band adds a contrasting texture and some truly exciting solos." Karl Ackermann gave a four and a half stars and says in All About Jazz that "Eick favors minimalist constructs and otherworldly atmospherics, qualities that are well suited in imagining the theme and mood he has intended for Midwest, a warm album as natural and comforting as going home."

Track listing
ECM Records – ECM 2410.

Personnel
Mathias Eick – trumpet
Gjermund Larsen – violin
Jon Balke – piano
Mats Eilertsen – double bass
Helge Norbakken – percussion

References

ECM Records albums
2015 albums
Albums produced by Manfred Eicher